Sail On is the 24th studio album by the Christian music vocal group The Imperials. Released in 1977, it is their first album on Word Records' DaySpring label. It is also the first appearance of two new members, Russ Taff on lead vocals and David Will on baritone vocals, in addition to founding member, bass vocalist Armond Morales and tenor Jim Murray. Taff and Will replaced Sherman Andrus and Terry Blackwood, who went on to form the Christian music duo Andrus, Blackwood and Company in 1977 after the release of the 1976 Imperials' album Just Because.

In 1978, the group won their second Grammy Award for Best Gospel Performance, Contemporary or Inspirational for Sail On at the 20th Grammy Awards and at 10th GMA Dove Awards they were named Male Group of the Year. The Imperials' first chart appearances was on CCM Magazines contemporary hit radio chart in August 1978 with the title song climbing to number three a couple of months later. Sail On has never been released on CD.

Track listing

PersonnelThe Imperials Russ Taff – lead vocals
 Jim Murray – tenor, vocals
 David Will – baritone, vocals
 Armond Morales – bass, vocals

Charts
Radio singles

AccoladesGrammy AwardsGMA Dove Awards'
1978 Male Group of the Year

References

1977 albums
The Imperials albums
Word Records albums